The Department of Education is a department of the Government of Australia formed on 1 July 2022.

History
The department was formed by way of an Administrative Arrangements Order issued on 1 June 2022. It split the preceding Department of Education, Skills and Employment into the newly formed Department of Education and Department of Employment and Workplace Relations.

Preceding departments
The Department of Education's predecessor departments have been:
 Department of Education and Science (13 December 1966 – 19 December 1972)
 Department of Education (19 December 1972 – 11 March 1983)
 Department of Education and Youth Affairs (11 March 1983 – 13 December 1984)
 Department of Education (13 December 1984 – 24 July 1987)
 Department of Employment, Education and Training (DEET) (24 July 1987 – 11 March 1996)
 Department of Employment, Education, Training and Youth Affairs (DEETYA) (11 March 1996 – 21 October 1998)
 Department of Education, Training and Youth Affairs (DETYA) (21 October 1998 – 26 November 2001)
 Department of Education, Science and Training (DEST) (26 November 2001 – 3 December 2007)
 Department of Education, Employment and Workplace Relations (DEEWR) (3 December 2007 – 18 September 2013)
 Department of Education (18 September 2013 – 23 December 2014)
 Department of Education and Training (23 December 2014 – 29 May 2019)
 Department of Education (29 May 2019 – 1 February 2020)
 Department of Education, Skills and Employment (DESE) (1 February 2020 – 1 July 2022)

Operational Activities 
The functions of the department are broadly classified into the following matters:

 Schools education policy and programmes
 Education transitions policy and programmes
 Youth affairs and programmes, including youth transitions
 Pre-school education policy and programmes
 Higher education policy, regulation and programmes
 Policy, coordination and support for international education and research
 engagement
 Co-ordination of research policy in relation to universities
 Creation and development of research infrastructure
 Research grants and fellowships
 Early childhood education and care policy and programmes
 Co-ordination of early childhood development policy and responsibilities

See also

 Minister for Education (Australia)
 List of Australian Commonwealth Government entities
 Education in Australia

References

External links
 Department of Education and Training website
 Australian Institute for Teaching and School Leadership Website

2022 establishments in Australia
Education
Education policy in Australia
Australia
Australia, Education
Public policy in Australia